Agathistoma is a genus of small to medium-sized sea snails, marine gastropod molluscs in the family Tegulidae.

Species
 Agathistoma fasciatum (Born, 1778)
 Agathistoma hotessierianum (d'Orbigny, 1842)
 Agathistoma lividomaculatum (C. B. Adams, 1845)
 Agathistoma nordestinum Dornellas, Graboski, Hellberg & Lotufo, 2021
 Agathistoma viridulum (Gmelin, 1791)

References

 Olsson A.A. & Harbison A. (1953). Pliocene Mollusca of southern Florida with special reference to those from North Saint Petersburg. Monographs of the Academy of Natural Sciences of Philadelphia. 8: 1-457, pls. 1-65.

External links
 Alf A. (2019). Tegulidae and Turbinidae of the northeast Pacific. Zoosymposia. 13: 70-82

Tegulidae
Gastropod genera